A dual-tracked roller coaster is a roller coaster that consists of two tracks. They can be configured as racing, dueling, or Möbius loop roller coasters. Some dual-track coasters operate only one track side at a time, including Rolling Thunder and Colossus. Others may opt to run one side facing frontward and one side facing backward.

Variants

: consists of two separate roller coasters that travel along parallel or mirrored tracks to simulate a race between the trains. The coaster trains travel along tracks just a few feet apart from one another. They often get close enough for riders to reach out and slap hands with riders on the opposite train, though this is extremely dangerous. These coasters are usually old wooden coasters.

: features two (or more) roller coasters, usually with a similar layout, built close to each other. The rides are designed to do just as the name indicates: to duel. The coaster's layout often consists of strategic maneuvering to produce near-hits between the two coaster trains, designed to induce a greater adrenaline rush for the rider than a stand-alone roller coaster.

: this can be a racing roller coaster or a dueling roller coaster; there is one continuous track shared by both trains. As a result, the side of the station that a train begins on is not the same side on which it returns. For each cycle, each train travels half the track. In less common configurations, a Möbius loop coaster train travels the entire length of the track before returning, such as with Twisted Colossus and West Coast Racers at Six Flags Magic Mountain.

Examples

References

External links

 Möbius Loop roller coaster at RCDB

 
Types of roller coaster
 

fr:Duel de montagnes russes
fr:Montagnes russes à anneau de Möbius
nl:Duellerende achtbaan